Julian Reister was the defending champion but chose not to compete.

Máximo González won the title, defeating Gastão Elias in the final, 6–2, 6–3.

Seeds

  Máximo González (champion)
  Guido Andreozzi (first round, retired)
  Marc Gicquel (second round)
  David Guez (first round)
  Grégoire Burquier (first round)
  Gastão Elias (final)
  Rogério Dutra Silva (first round)
  Martín Alund (first round)

Draw

Finals

Top half

Bottom half

References
 Main Draw
 Qualifying Draw

Internationaux de Tennis de Blois
2014 Singles